In algebraic geometry, the Enriques–Babbage theorem states that a canonical curve is either a set-theoretic intersection of quadrics, or trigonal, or a plane quintic.

References

Algebraic curves
Theorems in algebraic geometry